Frimodig kyrka (en: Bold or Fearless Church) is a nominating group for the church elections in Church of Sweden founded 2005 after a split from POSK. 

Frimodig kyrka wants to change the election system to a non political system without any political parties participating. The group does not accept gay marriage and promotes respect for the dissenting minority concerning female priesthood. The group got 13 seats in the Church Assembly at the election 2009.

External links

 Frimodig kyrka - Official web site.

Nominating groups in Church of Sweden politics